Edward Eli "Eddie" Dorohoy (March 13, 1929 – May 28, 2009) was a professional ice hockey centre. He played in 16 games for the Montreal Canadiens in 1948–49 season and scored no points. He was born in Medicine Hat, Alberta.

He left behind his wife, Shirley, four children, eight grandchildren, and four great-grandchildren.

Awards and achievements
MJHL First All-Star Team Coach (1967)

References

External links
 

1929 births
2009 deaths
Calgary Stampeders (WHL) players
Canadian ice hockey centres
Cincinnati Mohawks (AHL) players
Ice hockey people from Alberta
Los Angeles Blades players
Montreal Canadiens players
New Haven Blades players
Sportspeople from Medicine Hat
Vancouver Canucks (WHL) players
Winnipeg Jets (WHL) coaches
Canadian ice hockey coaches